Max's may refer to:

 Max's Restaurant, restaurant chain in the Philippines
 Max's Famous Hotdogs, restaurant in Long Branch, New Jersey
 Max's Kansas City, a former music venue in New York, New York
 Max's Steaks, a cheesesteak and hoagie restaurant in North Philadelphia, Pennsylvania